Subuk (died 922?) was a ghulam who gained the governorship of Azerbaijan in 919 and held it for three years.

In 919, Subuk's master, the Sajid Yusuf Ibn Abu'l-Saj, was captured by forces of the caliph, with whom he had been at war. Acting in order to protect Yusuf's interests, Subuk took control of Azerbaijan. After defeating a caliphal army, he was recognized as governor of the province by al-Muqtadir. For the next three years, he awaited the return of Yusuf. The latter was freed from prison and returned to Azerbaijan in 922; Subuk had died by that time.

References

 Madelung, Wilferd. "Minor Dynasties of Northern Iran." The Cambridge History of Iran, Volume 4: The Period From the Arab Invasion to the Saljuqs. p. 231 Ed. R. N. Frye. New York, New York: Cambridge University Press, 1975.

Ghilman
10th century in the Abbasid Caliphate
920s deaths
Sajid rulers